Anastasiya Romanivna Voznyak (born 9 December 1998) is a Ukrainian female rhythmic gymnast. Voznyak competed alongside London 2012 Olympians Olena Dmytrash, Yevgeniya Gomon, Valeriia Gudym, and rookie Oleksandra Gridasova at the 2016 Summer Olympics in Rio de Janeiro, where she and her Ukrainian team placed seventh in the group all-around final with a total score of 34.282. In 2021, she was part of Ukrainian group that competed at the delayed 2020 Olympic Games in Tokyo, Ukraine and took 7th place in group all-around Final with a total score of 77.600.

References

External links 
 

1998 births
Living people
Ukrainian rhythmic gymnasts
Sportspeople from Lviv
Gymnasts at the 2016 Summer Olympics
Olympic gymnasts of Ukraine
Gymnasts at the 2015 European Games
Gymnasts at the 2019 European Games
European Games medalists in gymnastics
European Games silver medalists for Ukraine
European Games bronze medalists for Ukraine
Universiade medalists in gymnastics
Universiade silver medalists for Ukraine
Medalists at the 2019 Summer Universiade
Medalists at the Rhythmic Gymnastics European Championships
Gymnasts at the 2020 Summer Olympics
21st-century Ukrainian women